Lepanthes scopula is a species of orchid found from Mexico (Oaxaca and Chiapas) to Central America.

References

External links 

scopula
Orchids of Central America
Flora of Oaxaca
Orchids of Chiapas